The Protection of Animals Act 1934 was an act of the British parliament effectively making rodeo, as it then existed, illegal in England, Scotland and Wales.  The law was based upon the perceived cruelty to animals exhibited at western rodeos brought by promotions such as Tex Austin's 1924 "King of the Rodeo" exhibition at Wembley Stadium in 1924, the first such program in England.

The act was repealed and replaced by the Animal Welfare Act 2006 and the Animal Health and Welfare (Scotland) Act 2006 respectively.

Analysis
The first section provided that roping any unbroken horse or untrained bull was illegal.  This was followed by prohibitions on "wrestling, fighting, or struggling with any untrained bull", and on stimulating a horse or bull to buck.  This last provision would exclude cinch straps specifically designed to irritate the animal or a strap cinched around its genitals. The prohibitions applied not only to the riders and the stock contractors preparing the animals, but to any promoter of the contests or exhibitions.

The penalties were fines of up to 100 pounds, or up to three months in gaol, per violation.

Geographic scope
The last section of the act provided that it was not effective for Northern Ireland.

See also 
 Animal welfare in the United Kingdom

Notes

References

Protection of Animals Act 1934, Chapter 21 Geo. 5

External links

United Kingdom Acts of Parliament 1934
Animal welfare and rights legislation in the United Kingdom